Tokyo Station is a railway station in Chiyoda, Tokyo, Japan. The original station is located in Chiyoda's Marunouchi business district near the Imperial Palace grounds. The newer Eastern extension is not far from the Ginza commercial district. Due to the large area covered by the station, it is divided into the Marunouchi (west) and Yaesu (east) sides in its directional signage.

Served by the high-speed rail lines of the Shinkansen network, Tokyo Station is the main inter-city rail terminal in Tokyo. It is the busiest station in Japan, with more than 4,000 trains arriving and departing daily, and the fifth-busiest in eastern Japan in terms of passenger throughput; on average, more than 500,000 people use Tokyo Station every day. The station is also served by many regional commuter lines of Japan Railways, as well as the Tokyo Metro network.

Lines
Trains on the following lines are available at Tokyo Station:

  Tōhoku Shinkansen
  Yamagata Shinkansen
  Akita Shinkansen
  Jōetsu Shinkansen
  Hokuriku Shinkansen
  Hokkaido Shinkansen
  Tōkaidō Main Line
  Ueno–Tokyo Line
  Keihin–Tōhoku Line
  Yamanote Line
 Chūō Main Line (including  Chūō Line (Rapid))
 Sōbu Main Line (including  Sōbu Line (Rapid), Limited Express Narita Express, Ayame, Shiosai)
  Yokosuka Line (including Limited Express Narita Express)
  Keiyō Line

  (through services to/from San'yō Shinkansen operated by JR West)
 Tokyo Metro
  Marunouchi Line

The station is linked by underground passageways to the Ōtemachi underground (subway) station complex served by the Tōzai, Chiyoda, Hanzōmon, and Mita subway lines.

It is also possible to walk to the Nijūbashimae, Hibiya, Yūrakuchō, Ginza, and Higashi-ginza Stations completely underground (the last a distance of over ), but these stations can usually be reached more quickly by train.

Tokyo Station is also a major intercity bus terminal, with regular midday service to several cities in the Kantō region and overnight service to the Kansai and Tōhoku regions.

Station layout

The main station facade on the western side of the station is brick-built, surviving from the time when the station opened in 1914. The main station consists of 10 island platforms serving 20 tracks, raised above street level and running in a north–south direction. The main concourse runs east–west below the platforms.

The Shinkansen lines are on the east (or Yaesu) side of the station, along with a multi-storey Daimaru department store. The entrances nearest to the Shinkansen lines are named Yaesu, and those at the extreme East of the station are named Nihonbashi.

On the far west side is the Marunouchi entrances, which are closest to the two underground Sōbu/Yokosuka line platforms serving four tracks (five stories below ground level). The Narita Express to Narita International Airport (NRT) uses these platforms.

The two Keiyō Line platforms serving four tracks are four stories below ground some hundreds of meters to the south of the main station with moving walkways to serve connecting passengers.

The whole complex is linked by an extensive system of underground passageways that merge with surrounding commercial buildings and shopping centers.

JR

Main-level platforms
(listed in order from west to east)

JR East

Yokosuka/Sōbu Line platforms

Keiyo Line platforms

JR Central

Originally, platforms 3 to 10 were numbered as platforms 1 to 8 and additional platforms were numbered sequentially from west to east through the opening of the Tōkaidō Shinkansen in 1964. Platforms 9 to 13 were used for the Tōkaidō Main Line and Yokosuka Line but were removed in 1988, and platforms 12 and 13 were then used for the new Tōhoku Shinkansen from 1991 to 1997. The current Chūō Main Line platform opened in 1995 as platforms 1 and 2, and other platforms were renumbered accordingly, leaving platforms 10 and 11 unused. The current platform numbering became effective in 1997 when one of the Tōkaidō Main Line platforms was repurposed for the Jōetsu Shinkansen as platforms 20 and 21. The existing Tōhoku Shinkansen platforms were simultaneously renumbered as 22 and 23.

Tokyo Metro

History

 

In 1889, a Tokyo municipal committee drew up plans for an elevated railway line connecting the Tōkaidō Main Line terminal at Shinbashi to the Nippon Railway (now Tōhoku Main Line) terminal at Ueno. The Imperial Diet resolved in 1896 to construct a new station on this line called , located directly in front of the gardens of the Imperial Palace.

Construction was delayed by the outbreak of the First Sino-Japanese War and Russo-Japanese War, but finally commenced in 1908. The three-story station building was designed by architect Tatsuno Kingo (who also designed Manseibashi Station and the nearby Bank of Japan building) as a restrained celebration of Japan's costly victory in the Russo-Japanese War. The building is often rumored to be fashioned after Amsterdam Centraal station in the Netherlands, although there is little evidence to support the opinion. Terunobu Fujimori, a scholar of Western architecture, denies the rumor, having studied Tatsuno's styles as well as the building itself.

Tokyo Station opened on December 20, 1914 with four platforms; two serving electric trains (current Yamanote/Keihin–Tōhoku Line platforms) and two serving non-electric trains (current Tōkaidō Line platforms). The Chūō Main Line extension to the station was completed in 1919 and originally stopped at the platform now used by northbound Yamanote/Keihin–Tōhoku trains. During this early era, the station only had gates on the Marunouchi side, with the north side serving as an exit and the south side serving as an entrance. The Yaesu side of the station opened in 1929.

Much of the station was destroyed in a B-29 firebombing raid on May 25, 1945. The bombing shattered the impressive rooftop domes and the entire third floor of the building. The station was quickly rebuilt within a year, but the restored building had only two stories instead of three, and simple angular roofs were built in place of the original domes. These postwar alterations were blamed for creating the mistaken impression that the building was based on the Centraal station in Amsterdam. Plans in the 1980s to demolish the building and replace it with a larger structure were derailed by a preservation movement.

The Yaesu side was also rebuilt after the war, but the new structure was damaged by fire in 1949, and this side of the building was then significantly upgraded with a contemporary exterior and a large Daimaru department store. The new Yaesu side facilities opened in 1953, including two new platforms for Tōkaidō Main Line services (now used by Shinkansen trains). Two more platforms opened in 1964 to accommodate the first Shinkansen services. The Yaesu side was partially rebuilt again in 1991 to accommodate the Shinkansen extension from Ueno.

A plan was finalized in 1971 to build a Narita Shinkansen high-speed line connecting Tokyo Station to Narita International Airport. The line was envisioned as extending underground from Tokyo to Shinjuku Station, and the plan was to build the platforms underneath Kajibashi-dori (to the south of Tokyo Station) to avoid the need to run the line under the Imperial Palace. Construction of the Narita Shinkansen was halted in 1983 due to difficulties acquiring the necessary land to build the line, but the area set aside for its platforms was eventually used for the Keiyō Line and Musashino Line terminals, which opened in 1990.

From July 1987, the station hosted a series of regular free public concerts referred to as "Tokyo Eki Kon" (Tokyo Station Concerts). These were first held as a celebration of the launch of Japan Railways Group as the privatized successor to the state-owned Japanese National Railways. Altogether 246 concerts were performed, but the event was discontinued when its popularity waned and the last concert took place in November 2000. The event returned in 2004 as the "Aka Renga (Red Brick) Concerts" but it was again suspended, after 19 concerts, when redevelopment of the station started in earnest. In 2012, as the reconstruction was nearing completion, there were calls for the concerts to resume.

The station facilities of the Marunouchi Line were inherited by Tokyo Metro after the privatization of the Teito Rapid Transit Authority (TRTA) in 2004.

The Tokyo Station complex has undergone extensive development, including major improvements to the Marunouchi (west) and Yaesu (east) sides of the station. The Marunouchi side underwent an extensive five-year renovation, completed in October 2012, in which the historic 98-year-old façade on this side of the station was restored to its pre-war condition. The restoration work included recreating the two domes according to their original design. The surrounding area was converted into a broad plaza (Marunouchi Central Plaza) extending into a walkway toward the Imperial Palace, with space for bus and taxi ranks. In contrast, the Yaesu side of the station is very urban in appearance. The North and South GranTokyo towers are connected to the terminal by the GranRoof, a new commercial facility with a large canopy representing a "sail of light" which covers the outdoor areas. The high-rise towers include multi-story shopping areas and the offices of a number of leading companies and universities. This part of the project was completed in 2013.

Station numbering was introduced to the JR East commuter platforms in 2016 with Tokyo being assigned station numbers JT01 for the Tokaido Line, JU01 for the Utsunomiya/Takasaki lines, JK26 for the Keihin-Tōhoku line, JY01 for the Yamanote line, JC01 for the Chūō line rapid service, JO19 for both the Sōbu line rapid service as well as the adjoining Yokosuka line, and JE01 for the Keiyō line. At the same time, JR East assigned a three-letter code to their major interchange station; Tokyo was assigned the three-letter code "TYO".

Assassinations
Tokyo Station has been the site of the assassination of two Japanese prime ministers. On November 4, 1921, Hara Takashi was stabbed to death by a right-wing railroad switchman in front of the south wing as he arrived to board a train for Kyoto. On November 14, 1930, Osachi Hamaguchi was shot by a member of the Aikokusha ultra-nationalist secret society. He survived the attack but died of his wounds in August the following year.

Proposed developments
There was a proposal to build a spur to Tokyo Station from the nearby Toei Asakusa Line, which would provide another connection to the subway network, and also possibly provide faster connections from the station to Tokyo's airports, Haneda and Narita. The plan has yet to be formally adopted. Authorities are re-considering a similar plan as part of the infrastructure improvements for the 2020 Summer Olympics; the proposed line would cut travel time to Haneda from 30 minutes to 18 minutes, and to Narita from 55 minutes to 36 minutes, at a total cost of around 400 billion yen.

There are also plans to extend the Tsukuba Express from Akihabara to Tokyo. In September 2013, a number of municipalities along the Tsukuba Express line in Ibaraki Prefecture submitted a proposal to complete the extension at the same time as the new airport-to-airport line.

Tokyo Metro is also planning Tokyo as the terminus for their future line that could connect Odaiba.

Passenger statistics

In fiscal 2018, the JR East station was used by an average of 467,165 passengers daily (boarding passengers only), making it the third busiest station on the JR East network. Over the same fiscal year, the Tokyo Metro station was used by an average of 218,275 passengers daily (both exiting and entering passengers), making it the ninth-busiest Tokyo Metro station. The passenger figures (boarding passengers only) for the JR East (formerly JNR) station in previous years are as shown below.

Surrounding area

Districts
 Marunouchi
 Yaesu
 Ginza

Buildings
 Tokyo Imperial Palace
 Marunouchi Building
 Shin-Marunouchi Building
 JP Tower
 Tokyo International Forum
 Mitsubishi Ichigokan Museum, Tokyo

Hotels
Shangri-La Hotel, Tokyo
Metropolitan Hotel, Tokyo

Stations
Other stations within walking distance of Tokyo station include the following.
 Ōtemachi Station (Tokyo Metro Marunouchi Line, Tokyo Metro Chiyoda Line, Tokyo Metro Tōzai Line, Tokyo Metro Hanzōmon Line, Toei Mita Line)
 Hatchōbori Station (Keiyō Line, Tokyo Metro Hibiya Line)
 Nihombashi Station (Tokyo Metro Ginza Line, Tokyo Metro Tōzai Line, Toei Asakusa Line)
 Mitsukoshimae Station (Tokyo Metro Hanzōmon Line, Tokyo Metro Ginza Line)
 Shin-Nihombashi Station (Sōbu Line Rapid)
 Nijūbashimae Station ( Tokyo Metro Chiyoda Line)
 Hibiya Station (Tokyo Metro Hibiya Line, Tokyo Metro Chiyoda Line, Toei Mita Line)
 Yūrakuchō Station (Yamanote Line, Keihin-Tōhoku Line, Tokyo Metro Yūrakuchō Line)
 Ginza-itchōme Station (Tokyo Metro Yūrakuchō Line)
 Kyōbashi Station (Tokyo Metro Ginza Line)
 Takarachō Station (Toei Asakusa Line)

Bus terminal 

 Yaesu South Exit Highway Bus Terminal

Sister stations
Tokyo Station has "sister station" agreements with Amsterdam Centraal station in the Netherlands, Grand Central Terminal in New York, USA, Beijing railway station in China, Hsinchu Station in Taiwan, and Frankfurt (Main) Hauptbahnhof in Germany.

See also

 List of East Japan Railway Company stations
 List of railway stations in Japan
 Transport in Greater Tokyo
 List of development projects in Tokyo
 Ramen Street – an area in Tokyo Station's underground mall specializing in ramen dishes

References

External links

 JR East map of Tokyo Station 
 Tokyo Station (JR East) 
 Tokyo Station (JR Central) 
 Tokyo Station (Tokyo Metro) 
 Guide Of Tokyo Train Station 

Railway stations in Japan opened in 1914
Buildings and structures in Chiyoda, Tokyo
Buildings and structures in Japan destroyed during World War II
Hokuriku Shinkansen
Jōetsu Shinkansen
Keihin-Tōhoku Line
Keiyō Line
Marunouchi
Railway stations in Tokyo
Rebuilt buildings and structures in Japan
Sōbu Main Line
Stations of Tokyo Metro
Tōkaidō Main Line
Tōkaidō Shinkansen
Tokyo Metro Marunouchi Line
Yamanote Line